Chuck Aoki also known as Charles Aoki (born 7 March 1991) is an American Paralympic wheelchair rugby player and a former wheelchair basketball player who currently plays for the United States national wheelchair rugby team. He initially pursued his career in wheelchair basketball before permanently switching to wheelchair rugby. He has represented United States at the Paralympics in 2012, 2016 and 2020. He is currently regarded as one of the top 3.0 classified players in the world.

Biography 
Aoki was identified to be diagnosed with hereditary sensory autonomic neuropathy soon after his birth. He was born with a rare genetic disorder which has inhibited the feeling in his hands and feet. Despite the health conditions, his behaviors were similar to the normal children and played baseball with his friends until the age of six. His mother once found that his knee began swelling and was found out that he had broken his femur. He continued walking normally like other children but he was advised by his doctor to use wheelchair from the age of 12 as his condition became worse.

He was named as Charles by his parents when he was born. However, his name was later changed to Chuck as he mistakenly pronounced his name as Chuck when he was asked by his doctor to tell his name. It happened when he was just six years old. He was forever called Chuck by his family and friends instead of referring to his given name Charles.

His father's family originally hails from Japan. His great-grandparents had lived in Japan most of their lifetime before immigrating to the US in early 1900s. His grandparents and great-grandparents were all imprisoned and were placed in an internment camp in United States during the peak of World War II. His grandfather joined the United States Army following the release of his family members who were imprisoned in the camps.

He pursued his master's degree in public policy at the University of Minnesota. He obtained his PhD degree in the field of international relations from the Josef Korbel School of International Studies which is attached to the University of Denver.

Career 
He began playing wheelchair basketball at the age of six and played the sport for about eleven years. He later switched to wheelchair rugby at the age of 15 when he was pursuing his higher studies at the Minneapolis's Southwest High School. He was inspired by the 2005 American documentary film Murderball which was based on the journey of the American wheelchair rugby players in the lead up to the 2004 Summer Paralympics. Aoki decided to pursue his career in wheelchair rugby after watching the documentary.

He made his wheelchair rugby international debut in 2009 and since then became a prominent member of the United States national wheelchair rugby team. He clinched the gold medal with the national team at the 2009 American Zonal Championship. He was part of the USA side which triumphed at the 2010 Wheelchair Rugby World Championship. United States Quad Rugby Association named him as the National Athlete of the Year in 2011.

He made his debut appearance at the Paralympics representing United States at the 2012 Summer Paralympics and was part of USA wheelchair rugby team which claimed bronze medal in the men's wheelchair rugby competition. He was a key member of the USA side which won the 2013 Wheelchair Rugby Tri-Nations tournament. He was adjudged as the best 3.0 class player during the 2014 Wheelchair Rugby World Championship where defending champions US claimed bronze medal.

Aoki was a key member of the USA side which narrowly missed out on winning the gold medal in the men's wheelchair gold medal match at the 2016 Summer Paralympics. Australia won the final 59–58 in a hard-fought tight match and USA settled for a silver medal. He captained the national wheelchair team at the 2018 Wheelchair Rugby World Championship where USA claimed bronze medal. He won gold medal with the USA team in the men's wheelchair tournament at the 2019 Parapan American Games.

He was named as one of two flag bearers along with Melissa Stockwell by the United States Olympic & Paralympic Committee to lead the United States contingent for the opening ceremony of the delayed 2020 Summer Paralympics. Prior to competing at his third Paralympic event in 2021, he underwent six surgeries for serious leg infection in February 2021.

References 

1991 births
Living people
Paralympic wheelchair rugby players of the United States
Paralympic silver medalists for the United States
Paralympic bronze medalists for the United States
American wheelchair rugby players
Sportspeople from Minneapolis
Wheelchair rugby players at the 2012 Summer Paralympics
Wheelchair rugby players at the 2016 Summer Paralympics
Wheelchair rugby players at the 2020 Summer Paralympics
Medalists at the 2012 Summer Paralympics
Medalists at the 2016 Summer Paralympics
Medalists at the 2020 Summer Paralympics
Paralympic medalists in wheelchair rugby
Metropolitan State University alumni
University of Minnesota alumni
University of Denver alumni
Josef Korbel School of International Studies people
American people of Japanese descent
American sportspeople of Japanese descent